Mohamed Fouzai is a Paralympic athlete from Tunisia competing mainly in category T46 long-distance events.

He competed in the 2008 Summer Paralympics in Beijing, China.  There he won a silver medal in the men's 5000 metres - T46 event, finished fourth in the men's 800 metres - T46 event, finished twelve in the men's 1500 metres - T46 event and did not finish in  the men's Marathon - T46 event

External links
 

Paralympic athletes of Tunisia
Athletes (track and field) at the 2008 Summer Paralympics
Paralympic silver medalists for Tunisia
Tunisian male long-distance runners
Year of birth missing (living people)
Living people
Medalists at the 2008 Summer Paralympics
Paralympic medalists in athletics (track and field)
21st-century Tunisian people